John Loughlin may refer to:

 John Loughlin (bishop) (1817–1891), first bishop of Brooklyn, New York
 John Loughlin (political scientist) (born c. 1948), British political science professor
 John J. Loughlin, Jr. (born 1959), politician

See also
John Laughlin (disambiguation)
John McLoughlin (disambiguation)